Rank comparison chart of non-commissioned officers and other personnel for navies of African states.

Other ranks

See also
Comparative navy enlisted ranks of the Commonwealth
Ranks and insignia of NATO navies enlisted

References

Military comparisons

Naval ranks